Reflex is a Russian girl band consisting of two members: Irene Nelson (Lead Vocals), Alyona Torganova (Vocals). The band was created in 1999 and the first single called   Distant Light   conquered the hit parade of Europa Plus radio station.

Discography
 2001 — Meet the New Day
 2002 — Go Crazy
 2002 — I Will Always Wait for You
 2002 — This is Love
 2003 — Non Stop
 2005 — Lyrics. I Love.
 2005 — Pulse
 2006 — Harem (Lounge feat. Chillout remixes)
 2008 — Blondes 126
 2014 — Memories
 2015 — Adult Girls

Trivia
 Reflex’s music video to the song  Polovinka  was the first music video in Russia to appear in HD format. The Video was shot in Dubai, United Arab Emirates.
 In 2005 the group took part in the national competition to represent Russia in the Eurovision Song Contest, but was dropped in the semifinal.

Awards
Reflex  four-time winner of  Golden Gramophone Award.

References

External links
 Official website

Russian girl groups
Musical groups established in 1999
Musical groups from Moscow
Eurodance groups
1999 establishments in Russia
Winners of the Golden Gramophone Award